Nurlan Zairollauly Nigmatulin (born 31 August 1962) is a Kazakh politician who served as the Chair of the Mazhilis from 22 June 2016 to 1 February 2022 and from 20 January 2012 to 3 April 2014. Prior to that, he headed the Presidential Administration of Kazakhstan, and was the first deputy chairman of Nur Otan from 2009 to 2012, and äkim of Karaganda Region from 2006 to 2009.

Early life and career 
Nurlan Nigmatulin was born to a Kazakh Muslim family in Karaganda as the son of Zairullah (Zaırollah) Nigmatulin and Zainab (Zeynep) Kariyeva.  In 1984, he graduated from the Karaganda Technical University as a mechanical engineer. That same year, he became an engineer and the head of the motor convoy of the Karagandaoblgaz Enterprise. From 1985 to 1990, Nigmatulin served as the First Secretary of the Leninist Young Communist League (Komsomol) of Kazakhstan, deputy head of the department of Komsomol organizations of the Central Committee of Youth of Kazakhstan, Secretary, and the First Secretary of the Karagandy Lenin Regional Committee of Youth of Kazakhstan.

In 1989, he completed the Moscow University for the Humanities under the Central Committee of the All-Union Leninist Young Communist League with a degree in political science. From 1990 to 1993, Nigmatulin served as the chairman of the Committee of Youth Organizations of Kazakhstan. In 1993 he became the president of the Tengri Kazakh-American Joint Venture. From 1995 to 1999, Nigmatulin served as the state inspector, deputy head of the Organizational and Control Department of the Presidential Administration.

Political career 
In 1999, he became the deputy akim of Astana. From 2002 to 2004, he served as the Deputy Minister of Transport and Communications of Kazakhstan. In June 2004, Nigmatulin became the deputy head of the Executive Office of the President and the head of the Department of Organizational Control Work and Personnel Policy. On 19 January 2006, Nigmatulin was appointed as the akim of Karaganda Region. From 19 November 2009 to 24 September 2012, he served as the First Deputy Chairman of the Nur Otan.

On 3 April 2014, he was appointed as the head of the Presidential Administration of Kazakhstan. From October to November 2014, Nigmatulin served as the Acting State Secretary of Kazakhstan.

Chairman of the Mazhilis (2012–2014, 2016–2022) 
At the 2012 Kazakh legislative election, Nigmatulin was elected as the member of the lower house Mazhilis from the Nur Otan party list at the time when other political parties made a comeback since 2004. In the first opening session, he was chosen as the chairman of the Mazhilis, as well as the parliamentary leader of Nur Otan on 20 January 2012.

On 21 June 2016, Nigmatulin became the member of Mazhilis again and the following day on 22 June, he was unanimously elected as its chairman. Just after assuming the post, Nigmatulin in an interview with Vlast.kz in August 2016, declared the Parliament to be open to dialogue "with constructive forces, but not with those who declare 'empty slogans'", promising for the legislative hearings to become "open and transparent to society" within the coming autumn session.

On 22 August 2019, Nigmatulin was chosen to be the parliamentary leader of the Nur Otan faction in the Mazhilis. Following the 2021 legislative elections, he was reelected to these posts simultaneously.

Nigmatulin announced his resignation from the Mazhilis chairmanship on 1 February 2022. From there, he gave remarks during his lawmaking career, saying: "These years will remain in my heart as one of the most significant and important in my life." He also wished the MPs in success for implementing all the tasks and reforms carried out today by President Kassym-Jomart Tokayev. Nigmatulin was succeeded by Erlan Qoşanov, who prior to that served as Tokayev's chief of staff.

Nigmatulin as a chairman considered bills related to countering terrorism and extremism, regulating migration, health care and social and labor relations, developing local self-government, ecology, transport, the activities of the courts and other issues. During his tenure, Mazhilis MPs began collaborating more with the expert communities, representatives of other political parties not included in the parliament, as well as the civil sector and vloggers. While several MPs became more active within social media.

Other activities

Corporate boards 
 Air Astana, chairman of the board of directors (2002–2004)
 ZAO National Innovative Technologies, member of the board of directors (2002–2003)
 Astana International Airport, chairman of the board of directors (2002–2003, 2003–2005)
 ZAO National Information Technologies, member of the board of directors (2002–2003)
 Kazakhtelecom, chairman of the board of directors (2003)
 Air Kazakhstan, chairman of the board of directors (2002–2003, 2003–2005)
 Kazakhtelecom, member of the board of directors (2002–2003)
 Investment Fund of Kazakhstan, member of the board of directors (2003–2004)
 Astana International Airport, chairman of the board of directors (2002–2003)

Non-profit organizations 
 Otan, chairman of the Astana city branch (2000–2002)
 Nur Otan, member of the Political Council Bureau (2009–2022)
 Nazarbayev's presidential campaign headquarters, head (2011)
 Security Council of Kazakhstan, member (2012–2022)
 National Commission for Modernization, deputy chairman (2015–2016)

International 
 Inter-Parliamentary Assembly of the Eurasian Economic Community (IPA EurAsEC), chairman (2013–2014)
 Interparliamentary Assembly of Member Nations of the Commonwealth of Independent States (IPA CIS), member of the council
 Parliamentary Assembly of the Collective Security Treaty Organization (CSTO PA), member of the council
 Parliamentary Assembly of the Turkic-speaking countries (TurkPA), chairman

Personal life
Nurlan Nigmatulin is a practicing Muslim.

Nigmatulin is married to Venera Baimirzayeva and has three children with her: Nurjan, Nurkhan, and Madiyar. He also has three grandchildren: grandsons Akbar, Tahir, and Ablai, and granddaughters: Aisara, Adel. His twin brother Erlan (born 1962) is a former member of the Mazhilis and Senate of Kazakhstan. His brother Argyn (born 1955) serves as the Director of Saryarka Hockey Club LLP and is a member of the Karaganda Maslihat. Nigmatulin enjoys tennis and football.

On 17 June 2020, Nigmatulin tested positive for COVID-19. As a result, he went into self-quarantine and worked remotely. Nigmatulin recovered from the virus on 2 July 2020.

Awards

 Order of The First President of the Republic of Kazakhstan – Leader of the Nation Nursultan Nazarbayev (2015)
 Order of Barys 2nd degree (2009)
 Order of Kurmet (2004)
 Order of Friendship (Russia, 2014)
 Order of the Commonwealth (2014)
 Medal "10 years of the Constitution of the Republic of Kazakhstan" (2006)
 Anniversary medal "10 years of Astana" (2008)
 Medal "20 years of independence of the Republic of Kazakhstan" (2011)
 Anniversary medal "20 years of Astana" (2018)

References

1962 births
Living people
Nur Otan politicians
People from Karaganda
Chairmen of the Mazhilis
Recipients of the Order of Kurmet